Tafana is a genus of South American anyphaenid sac spiders first described by Eugène Simon in 1903.

Species
 it contains sixteen species:
Tafana arawak de Oliveira & Brescovit, 2021 – Venezuela
Tafana chimire de Oliveira & Brescovit, 2021 – Venezuela
Tafana huatanay de Oliveira & Brescovit, 2021 – Colombia, Ecuador, Peru, Bolivia
Tafana humahuaca de Oliveira & Brescovit, 2021 – Argentina
Tafana kunturmarqa de Oliveira & Brescovit, 2021 – Colombia
Tafana maracay de Oliveira & Brescovit, 2021 – Venezuela
Tafana nevada de Oliveira & Brescovit, 2021 – Colombia, Venezuela
Tafana oliviae de Oliveira & Brescovit, 2021 – Argentina
Tafana orinoco de Oliveira & Brescovit, 2021 – Venezuela
Tafana pastaza de Oliveira & Brescovit, 2021 – Ecuador
Tafana pitieri de Oliveira & Brescovit, 2021 – Venezuela
Tafana quelchi (Pocock, 1895) – Venezuela, Guayana, Brazil
Tafana riveti Simon, 1903 – Colombia, Peru, Ecuador
Tafana ruizi de Oliveira & Brescovit, 2021 – Colombia
Tafana silhavyi (Caporiacco, 1955) – Venezuela
Tafana straminea (L. Koch, 1866) – Colombia, Ecuador

References

Anyphaenidae
Araneomorphae genera
Spiders of South America
Taxa named by Eugène Simon